Ventsia hollanderi is a species of sea snail, a marine gastropod mollusk, unassigned in the superfamily Seguenzioidea.

Distribution
This marine species occurs in deep water off Cuba.

References

 Fernández-Garcés R., Rubio F. & Rolán E. (2019). A new species of the genus Ventsia (Gastropoda, Seguenzioidea) from deep water of Cuba. Gloria Maris. 58(1): 23–25.

External links

hollanderi
Gastropods described in 2019